Christopher Kovacevich (December 25, 1928 – August 18, 2010) was metropolitan bishop of Libertyville and Chicago in the Serbian Orthodox Church making him Primate of Serbian Orthodox Christians in America. He was also the first American-born bishop to serve a diocese of the Serbian Church in North America.

Early life
Metropolitan Christopher (Kovacevich) was born in Galveston, Texas into a family of Serbian immigrants from Montenegro (he was the ninth of twelve children). His baptismal and secular name was Velimir Kovacevich.
After graduation from high school, he attended Nashotah House, an Anglo-Catholic seminary of the Episcopal Church located in Nashotah, Wisconsin and subsequently studied and graduated from St. Sava Serbian Orthodox Seminary in Libertyville, Illinois where he learned Serbian. He earned a B.A. (Philosophy) and a Master of Letters (History) at the University of Pittsburgh and a Master of Divinity from Holy Cross Greek Orthodox School of Theology, Brookline, Massachusetts. He also completed courses and examinations for a doctorate at the Chicago Theological Seminary. Later in life, Metropolitan Christopher was awarded a Doctor of Divinity degree (honoris causa) by Nashotah House

Priesthood
After graduating from St. Sava Serbian Orthodox Seminary he married the late Milka Kovacevich and afterward was ordained to the diaconate and priesthood in 1951.  During his parochial ministry, he served Serbian Orthodox parishes in Johnstown, Pittsburgh, and Chicago. While ministering to parishes in the Pennsylvania and Chicago areas, he served as chaplain at four local universities.

Becoming a widower in 1970, he was elevated to the episcopate (i.e. he became a bishop) by the Bishops' Council of the Serbian Orthodox Church in Belgrade in 1978 and tonsured with the monastic name of Christopher, becoming the first American-born bishop to serve a diocese of the Serbian Church in North America (he was consecrated bishop of the Eastern American Diocese, serving in that capacity from 1978 until 1991). Upon the 70th anniversary of the Midwestern Diocese of the Serbian Orthodox Church in the United States in 1991, he was elevated to the rank of Metropolitan, making him the first metropolitan of the newly formed Metropolitanate of Midwestern America, thereby becoming the Primate of the Serbian Orthodox in America. In 2009, during the restructuring of the dioceses in the United States and Canada, the Metropolitanate of Midwestern America became the Metropolitanate of Libertyville-Chicago. In May 2010 he served as secretary of the North American Episcopal Assembly of the Orthodox Church.

Metropolitan Christopher also frequently returned to the city of his birth to preside at weddings and baptisms at Saints Constantine and Helen Serbian Orthodox Church.

Death
Metropolitan Christopher died on August 18, 2010, in Libertyville, Illinois due to complications from bone, brain, and stomach cancer. He is interred in the Saint Sava Serbian Orthodox Monastery cemetery.

References

External links
   Metropolitan Christopher of Libertyville-Chicago fell asleep in the Lord 
  Memory Eternal! + Metropolitan Christopher

1928 births
2010 deaths
People from Galveston, Texas
People from Libertyville, Illinois
Bishops of the Serbian Orthodox Church
Metropolitans of the Serbian Orthodox Church
Serbian Orthodox Church in the United States
Eastern Orthodox bishops in the United States
American Eastern Orthodox bishops
American people of Serbian descent
Nashotah House alumni
University of Pittsburgh alumni
Deaths from bone cancer
Deaths from cancer in Illinois
Burials at the Saint Sava Serbian Orthodox Monastery in Libertyville, Illinois